The professional cycling team Riberalves-Alcobaça was a Portuguese team based in Alcobaça. It was one of the European teams in UCI Continental Tour.

Team roster

Major wins

2005
 Portuguese Road Race Championship, Joaquim Andrade
Stage 4 Volta a Portugal, Rui Lavarinhas
2006
Stage 3 Tour do Brasil, Pedro Soeiro
Special Sprints Vuelta a Extremadura, Bruno Sá
Stage 4b, Andrei Zintchenko
 Portuguese Time Trial Championship, Hélder Miranda

External links
Riberalves-Alcobaça-website

Riberalves-Alcobaca
Cycling teams established in 2006
Cycling teams disestablished in 2006
Defunct cycling teams based in Portugal
2006 establishments in Portugal
2006 disestablishments in Portugal